The Pokrass brothers were Soviet composing siblings:
 Dmitry Pokrass (1899–1978)
  (1905–1954) — the youngest brother, Soviet musician
 Samuel Pokrass (1897–1939) — the elder brother; emigrated to the United States in 1920s

Dmitry was the most famous of the brothers. He wrote most of his songs together with Daniil.

They also had a fourth brother:
 Arkady Pokrass — pianist and accompanist

Selected works by the Pokrass brothers 
 "March of the Soviet Tankmen" ("Марш советских танкистов")
 "Welcome Us, Beautiful Suomi (Finland)" ("Принимай нас, Суоми-красавица", "Suomi-kaunotar")
 "You Won't Mow Us Down with a Sharp Sabre" ("Не скосить нас саблей острой")
 "If Tomorrow Brings War" ("Если завтра война")
 "Red Cavalrymen" ("Красные кавалеристы")
"Three Tankmen" ("Три танкиста")
"I'm at Your Feet" ("Я у ног твоих")
"I Feel How Flowers Fall" ("Я чувствую, как падают цветы")

References 

Soviet composers
Soviet male composers
Soviet culture
Jewish Ukrainian musicians
Ukrainian composers
20th-century male musicians